"Distraction" is a song by American rapper Polo G. It was released as a single through Columbia Records on June 3, 2022. Polo wrote the song with producer Southside and co-producers Cubeatz (Tim and Kevin Gomringer). "Distraction" marks Polo's first official single since Hall of Fame 2.0 (2021), which serves as the deluxe edition of his third studio album, Hall of Fame (2021). Polo announced the song on May 26, 2022, alongside a trailer video.

Credits and personnel
 Polo G – vocals, songwriting
 Southside – production, songwriting
 Cubeatz
 Tim Gomringer – co-production, songwriting
 Kevin Gomringer – co-production, songwriting 
 Todd Hurtt – mixing, recording
 Patrizio Pigliapoco – mixing
 Eric Lagg – mastering
 Ignacio Portales – engineering assistance
 J Shriver – engineering assistance
 Jesse Navarro – engineering assistance
 Walker Riggs – engineering assistance

Charts

References

2022 singles
2022 songs
Polo G songs
Songs written by Polo G
Songs written by Southside (record producer)
Songs written by Tim Gomringer
Songs written by Kevin Gomringer
Song recordings produced by Southside (record producer)
Song recordings produced by Cubeatz